Egypt competed at the 1936 Summer Olympics in Berlin, Germany. 53 competitors, all men, took part in 30 events in 10 sports.

Medalists

Gold
 Anwar Mesbah — Weightlifting, Lightweight
 Khadr Sayed El-Touni — Weightlifting, Middleweight

Silver
 Saleh Soliman — Weightlifting, Featherweight

Bronze
 Ibrahim Shams — Weightlifting, Featherweight
 Ibrahim Wasif — Weightlifting, Light Heavyweight

Athletics

Basketball

Boxing

Diving

Fencing

Six fencers, all men, represented Egypt in 1936.

Men's foil
 Mahmoud Abdin
 Mauris Shamil
 Anwar Tawfik

Men's team foil
 Mahmoud Abdin, Mauris Shamil, Hassan Hosni Tawfik, Anwar Tawfik

Men's épée
 Marcel Boulad
 Mahmoud Abdin
 Mauris Shamil

Men's team épée
 Mahmoud Abdin, Marcel Boulad, Mauris Shamil, Hassan Hosni Tawfik, Anwar Tawfik

Men's sabre
 Mohamed Abdel Rahman

Football

First Round

Shooting

One shooter represented Egypt in 1936.

25 m rapid fire pistol
 Krikor Agathon

Swimming

Weightlifting

Wrestling

References

External links
Official Olympic Reports
International Olympic Committee results database

Nations at the 1936 Summer Olympics
1936
Olympics